Retired United States Army Lieutenant Colonel Gene Tunney Boyer (July 24, 1929 – August 27, 2016) was the chief pilot of Army One, the helicopter transporting the President of the United States, between 1964 and 1975.  Boyer was the pilot during President Richard Nixon's last day in office on August 9, 1974, when Nixon famously delivered the V sign just prior to leaving office.  He led the restoration of the VH-3A "Sea King" helicopter, tail number 150617, that served as Army One that day.  That helicopter is now on permanent display at the Richard Nixon Presidential Library and Museum.  Boyer also served Presidents Johnson and Ford as a White House pilot. Boyer co-wrote his memoirs, Inside the President’s Helicopter: Reflections of a White House Senior Pilot, with Jackie Boor.

References

External links
 Gene T. Boyer's website

1929 births
2016 deaths
Ohio University alumni
American Master Army Aviators
United States Army colonels
White House staff
Recipients of the Distinguished Flying Cross (United States)
Recipients of the Legion of Merit
Writers from Akron, Ohio